The Historical Museum Vidin, sometimes shortened to Konaka museum, is located in Vidin, Bulgaria. The museum, founded in 1956, is situated in a former Ottoman konak. The nice building is among the cultural memorials of the region.

Originally the 18th-century building was used as the Home by Osman Pazvantoğlu  and later as police office, and the central tower was a lighthouse. After liberation the building was reconstructed and enriched with elements from Bulgarian Renaissance architecture. In 1956, the building was used for a historical weapon show.

Sections 
 Archaeology (departments Prehistory, Classical Antiquity and Middle Ages) - located in Konaka
 Ethnography - located in the Krastata Kazarma (i.e. Cross barracks)
 Bulgarian lands in 15th-19th centuries - located in Konaka
 Numismatics 
 Modern history
 Recent history

External links 
 official website of the museum

References 

History museums in Bulgaria
Museums in Vidin